The Reverend Frances Margaret Young, OBE, FBA (born 1939) is a British Christian theologian and Methodist minister. She is Emeritus Professor at the University of Birmingham.

Biography
Frances Young taught theology at the University of Birmingham from 1971, becoming the Edward Cadbury Professor and Head of the Department of Theology in 1986. During her time at the University, she also served as Dean of the Faculty of Arts (1995–97) and Pro-Vice-Chancellor (1997–2002). In 1984, she was ordained as a Methodist minister, and has combined preaching in a local Circuit and pursuing her academic career. In 1998, she was awarded an OBE for services to Theology and in 2004, elected a Fellow of the British Academy.

In 2005, she retired from the University. On 15 November 2005, she preached at the opening service of the 8th General Synod of the Church of England, the first Methodist and the first woman to preach at the five-yearly inauguration ceremony. She delivered her sermon at the Eucharist service at which the then-Archbishop of Canterbury, Rowan Williams, presided.

She served as editor of volumes 39–43 of the Studia Patristica and wrote academic and more popular theological writings, drawing on her work on the New Testament and on Christianity in its formative centuries, but also on her experience as the mother of a son (Arthur) who was born with profound physical and mental disabilities.

Bibliography
Sacrifice and the death of Christ, Philadelphia : Westminster Press, 1975, 
The Myth of God Incarnate, ed. John Hick, London : SCM Press, 1977, 
Incarnation and Myth : The Debate Continued, ed. Michael Goulder, London : SCM Press, 1979, 
Can these dry bones live? : the excitement of theological study, London : SCM Press Ltd, 1982, 
From Nicaea to Chalcedon : a guide to the literature and its background, London : SCM Press, 1983, 
Meaning and Truth in 2 Corinthians, with David F Ford, London : SPCK, 1987, 
The art of performance: towards a theology of Holy Scripture, London : Darton, Longman and Todd, 1990, 
Face to Face: A Narrative Essay in the Theology of Suffering, Edinburgh : T. & T. Clark, 1991, 
The Making of the Creeds, London : SCM Press, 1991, 
Virtuoso Theology: The Bible and Interpretation, Eugene, OR : Wipf and Stock Publishers, 1993, 
Theology Of The Pastoral Letters, Cambridge ; New York : Cambridge University Press, 1994, 
Dare We Speak of God in Public?, London: Mowbray, 1995, 
Biblical Exegesis and the Formation of Christian Culture, Cambridge: Cambridge University Press, 1997, 
Brokenness and Blessing: Towards a Biblical Spirituality,Grand Rapids, Mich. : Baker Academic, 2007, 
God's Presence: A Contemporary Recapitulation of Early Christianity, Cambridge: Cambridge University Press 2013,  
Arthur's Call: A Journey of Faith in the Face of Severe Learning Disability, London : SPCK, 2014, 
All of You are one in Christ Jesus - Young, Frances M. All of You Are One in Christ Jesus : Bible Studies for the Fifth World Conference on Faith and Order. Santiago De Compostela, 1993. Geneva: Commission on Faith and Order, World Council of Churches, 1993. Print.

References

External links
Sermon by Frances Young entitled Bodily Creatures on disability
Myth and Incarnation by Jerry H. Gill, Christian Century 21 December 1977, p. 1190
Debating the Incarnation by Trevor Beeson, Christian Century 31 August – 7 September 1977. P. 740
Book Review, The Making of the Creeds
Review of Virtuoso Theology: The Bible and Interpretation
Revd Frances Young to preach at opening service of the General Synod 2005
Sermon on Judgement  In The New Testament, Society of St Francis
Text of Sermon at General Synod, 2005

1939 births
Academics of the University of Birmingham
British biblical scholars
Date of birth missing (living people)
English Christian theologians
English Methodist ministers
Fellows of the British Academy
Female biblical scholars
Living people
Methodist theologians
Officers of the Order of the British Empire
Place of birth missing (living people)